is a Japanese ice hockey player for DK Peregrine.

Early life and education
Hosoyamada was born to father Manabu and mother Yoko in Banff, Alberta, Canada. She began playing hockey at the age of five. She attended Syracuse University and graduated in 2015 with a degree in health and exercise science.

At Syracuse, she played college hockey for the Syracuse Orange from 2010-15, appearing in 151 games, the second-most games, notching the program’s fifth-most points by a defenseman with ten goals and 51 assists. Hosoyamada was named to College Hockey America's all-conference teams in her first and fifth years. She also served as the team captain.

Career
Hosoyamada played for the Canadian Women's Hockey League (CWHL)'s Calgary Inferno for the 2016-17 season, after which she relocated to Japan. She began playing for DK Peregrine in 2018.

Japan national team
Hosoyamada began attending Japan’s training camps in 2015 and started competing in 2016. She debuted for Japan women's national ice hockey team in 2017 Asian Winter Games. In the 2017 IIHF Women's World Championship in Austria, she scored a hat trick against Norway in a 5-3 comeback victory for Japan.

She competed for Japan in the 2018 Winter Olympics. She assisted on the third goal in Japan's first-ever Olympic victory over combined Koreas.

She was part of the team for the 2019 IIHF Women's World Championship in Finland.

Hosoyamada made her second Olympic appearance in the 2022 Winter Olympics.

References

External links
 
 
 

1992 births
Living people
Japanese women's ice hockey players
Olympic ice hockey players of Japan
Ice hockey players at the 2018 Winter Olympics
Ice hockey players at the 2022 Winter Olympics
Canadian women's ice hockey defencemen
Ice hockey people from Alberta
People from Banff, Alberta
Syracuse Orange women's ice hockey players
Calgary Inferno players
Asian Games medalists in ice hockey
Asian Games gold medalists for Japan
Ice hockey players at the 2017 Asian Winter Games
Medalists at the 2017 Asian Winter Games
21st-century Japanese women